Paul D. Thacker is an American journalist who reports on science, medicine, and the environment. He was a lead investigator of the United States Senate Committee on Finance for Senator Chuck Grassley, where he examined financial links between physicians and pharmaceutical companies.

Early life
Thacker was raised in California and Texas, and joined the US Army after high school, where he was deployed in Saudi Arabia and Iraq during the Gulf War. He earned a Bachelor of Science degree in biology, with an emphasis in ecology and evolution, from the University of California, Davis in 1997. He worked as a laboratory technician at Emory University before turning to journalism, leaving Emory for an Audubon magazine internship in 2000.

Career 
After 2000, Thacker wrote for publications such as The New Republic and Salon and was a staff writer with Environmental Science & Technology, a journal of the American Chemical Society (ACS). Here he published a series of exposés that a senior ACS official claimed showed an anti-industry bias, culminating in an article on the Weinberg Group that resulted in him being fired by the journal in 2006. In Thacker's Weinberg Group story he wrote about a letter that group sent to DuPont outlining a plan to protect DuPont from litigation and regulation over Teflon. The Weinberg Group had done similar work for Big Tobacco and then began working in Europe to defeat alcohol regulations.  ACS editor Rudy Baum called the Weinberg article a "hatchet job". In 2006, the Weinberg article won a second place prize in annual awards presented by the US Society of Environmental Journalists. Later that year, Thacker's work was profiled on Exposé: America's Investigative Reports.

In 2007, Thacker joined the United States Senate Committee on Finance for Republican Senator Chuck Grassley, investigating medical research conflicts of interest. Among his work he identified several physicians who had failed to disclose payments from drug and medical companies, including psychiatrist Charles Nemeroff. He also led the committee's investigation of the drug Avandia, which included a report that a medical journal had published a ghostwritten article promoting the drug. He left the committee in 2010 to join the Project on Government Oversight, a nonprofit watchdog organization.

From 2012 to 2014, Thacker completed two fellowships at Harvard University’s Safra Center for Ethics.

In November 2021, The BMJ published a piece by Thacker alleging there has been "poor practice" at Ventavia, one of the companies involved in the phase III evaluation trials of the Pfizer vaccine. The report was enthusiastically embraced by anti-vaccination activists. Questioning Thacker's work in Science-Based Medicine, David Gorski wrote that his article presented facts without necessary context to misleading effect, playing up the seriousness of the noted problems. Some experts have expressed skepticism over the allegations made in the report. Prominent vaccination expert Paul Offit has criticized the issues outlined in the report as being vague and has cautioned against assuming the claims made in it are true.  

Thacker received the 2021 British Journalism Award for Specialist Journalism for a series of articles in The BMJ investigating undisclosed financial interests among medical experts advising the US and UK governments on vaccines. The award judges said “[t]his was expertly researched and written journalism on a subject of huge national importance.”

Notes

External links

Thacker interview. "Science Fiction", Exposé: America's Investigative Reports, PBS

Living people
Year of birth missing (living people)
American medical journalists
University of California, Davis alumni
American science journalists